Twenty-two ships of the French Navy have borne the name Actif ("Active"):

Ships named Actif 
 , a 36-gun ship of the line, bore the name during her career 
 , a fireship, bore the name during her career 
 , a 34-gun frigate, bore the name during her career 
 , a fireship, bore the name during her career 
 , a fireship 
 , a fireship 
 , a 64-gun Illustre-class ship of the line 
 , a 74-gun Citoyen-class ship of the line 
 , a 12-gun cutter 
 , a brig 
 , a 2-gun cutter captured from the British 
 , a 4-gun cutter 
 , a gunboat 
 , a 12-gun brig 
 , a 4-gun cutter 
 , a brig 
 , a paddle steam tug 
 , a schooner 
 , an aviso 
 , an auxiliary minesweeper 
 , a tug 
 , a coastal tug

Notes and references
Notes

References

Bibliography
 
 

French Navy ship names